The Greater Greensboro Consortium is an educational consortium of colleges and universities in Guilford County, North Carolina. The Consortium includes 8 schools; 2 public universities, 2 private universities, 2 private co-educational colleges, a private women's college, and a Community College. The Consortium agreement allows students to cross register for courses at any of the other institutions, up to 50% of their credit hours in a given semester. The agreement also gives full access to the libraries at the other schools. Students will have to pay for the per-credit hour cost and books, but not any additional tuition costs. Also, they will have to abide by the grading standards and honor codes of the school they've cross-enrolled at while they are in those classes

Members
The members of the consortium are: 
 The University of North Carolina at Greensboro
 North Carolina A&T State University
 Elon University
 High Point University
 Guilford College
 Greensboro College
 Bennett College for Women
 Guilford Technical Community College

In addition to course registration and library privileges, students attending the colleges in Greensboro itself (UNC-Greensboro, NC A&T, Guilford, Greensboro, Bennett, Elon School of Law, and Guilford Tech) have free access to the HEAT (Higher Education Area Transit) bus which makes stops throughout Greensboro.

References 

College and university associations and consortia in the United States
Universities and colleges in North Carolina